Thryptocerus is a genus of beetles in the family Carabidae, containing the following species:

 Thryptocerus agaboides (Fairmaire, 1868)
 Thryptocerus anthracinus (Brancsik, 1893)
 Thryptocerus ebeninus Basilewsky, 1943
 Thryptocerus perrieri Jeannel, 1949
 Thryptocerus politus Chaudoir, 1878

References

Licininae